Eyad is an Arabian given name that may refer to one of the following people:

Eyad Abu Abaid (born 1994), Israeli footballer
Eyad Hammoud (born 2001), Lebanese footballer
Eyad Hutba (born 1987), Arab-Israeli footballer
Eyad Ismoil (born 1971), Jordanian terrorist who took part in the 1993 World Trade Center bombing
Eyad al-Sarraj (1944-2013), Palestinian psychiatrist

See also
Iyad

Arabic given names